Osmyloidea is a euneuropteran superfamily in the lacewing order Neuroptera sister to the superfamilies Dilaroidea, Mantispoidea, and the clade Neoneuroptera.  The superfamily includes three living families and two extinct families described from the fossil record.

Taxonomy
Nevrorthidae (Late Cretaceous-Present)
Osmylidae (Early Jurassic-Present)
Sisyridae (Late Cretaceous-Present)
†Archeosmylidae (Permian-Triassic)
†Saucrosmylidae (Middle Jurassic)

References 

Neuroptera
Insect superfamilies